Karen Sogn, née Thaugland (28 April 1931 – 21 October 2013) was a Norwegian politician for the Conservative Party.

She was elected to the Parliament of Norway from Vestfold in 1977, and was re-elected in 1981 to serve until 1985. She had previously served as a deputy representative during the term 1973–1977.

On the local level she was a member of Lardal municipal council from 1967 to 1979, serving as deputy mayor from 1975 to 1977.

References

1931 births
2013 deaths
Vestfold politicians
Conservative Party (Norway) politicians
Members of the Storting
Women members of the Storting
20th-century Norwegian politicians
20th-century Norwegian women politicians